Invisible Republic is the second album by the Canadian indie rock band Young Galaxy, released August 25, 2009 on Fontana North.

The album is a longlisted nominee for the 2010 Polaris Music Prize.

Track listing
All songs feature Liam O'Neil on drums, Max Henry on keyboards, Stephen Kamp on bass, Catherine McCandless on vocals and Stephen Ramsay on guitars and vocals.

References 

2009 albums
Young Galaxy albums